Pećinci is a village and municipality located in the Srem District of the autonomous province of Vojvodina, Serbia. The village has a population of 2,581 (2011), while Pećinci municipality has 19,720 inhabitants.

Name
In Serbo-Croatian, the village is known as Pećinci (Пећинци), in Hungarian as Pecsince, in German as Petschinzi, in Slovak as Pečinci, and in Rusyn as Печинци. Its name derived from the Serbian word "peć/пећ" ("furnace" in English), or "petlja/петља" ("loop" or "noose" in English). The name of the village in Serbo-Croatian is plural.

History
The village was first time recorded by the sources in 1416. After that time, there were no other records about this settlement until 1702. The village was under Ottoman administration until the Treaty of Passarowitz (1718), when it passed to Habsburg monarchy. During Habsburg administration, it was part of the Habsburg Military Frontier. From 1848 to 1849, the village was part of Serbian Vojvodina, but was again included into Military Frontier in 1849. After abolishment of the frontier (in 1882), it was included into Syrmia County of Croatia-Slavonia, which was an autonomous kingdom within the Kingdom of Hungary and Austria-Hungary. According to the 1910 census, the village had a Serb ethnic majority.

In 1918, the village first became part of the State of Slovenes, Croats and Serbs, then part of the Kingdom of Serbia, and finally part of the newly formed Kingdom of Serbs, Croats and Slovenes (later renamed to Yugoslavia). From 1918 to 1922, the village was part of the Syrmia County, from 1922 to 1929 part of the Syrmia oblast, and from 1929 to 1941 part of the Danube Banovina. From 1941 to 1944, the village was occupied by the Axis Powers and was attached to Pavelić's Independent State of Croatia. Territory of present-day Pećinci municipality was an important center of partisan resistance movement and a partisan liberated territory was formed in this area during the war.

After the war, the village became part of Vojvodina, an autonomous province of the Socialist Republic of Serbia and Socialist Federative Republic of Yugoslavia. Until 1960, villages of present-day Pećinci municipality were part of the municipalities of Ruma, Stara Pazova and Zemun (village of Pećinci itself was part of Zemun municipality). A separate municipality of Pećinci was formed in 1960 and the village of Pećinci was chosen to be the municipal center because of its favorable traffic position.

Inhabited places
Aside from the village of Pećinci, municipality includes the following villages:

 Ašanja
 Brestač
 Deč
 Donji Tovarnik
 Karlovčić
 Kupinovo
 Obrež
 Ogar
 Popinci
 Prhovo
 Sibač
 Sremski Mihaljevci
 Subotište
 Šimanovci

Demographics

According to the 2011 census results, the municipality has 19,720 inhabitants.

Ethnic groups
All settlements in the municipality have an ethnic Serb majority. The ethnic composition of the municipality:

Economy
The following table gives a preview of total number of registered people employed in legal entities per their core activity (as of 2018):

See also
 List of cities, towns and villages in Vojvodina
 List of places in Serbia

References

External links

 www.pecinci.org

 
Populated places in Syrmia
Municipalities and cities of Vojvodina
Srem District